Vidović or Vidovich (Cyrillic script: Видовић) is a South Slavic surname, particularly common in Croatia, with 6,838 carriers (2011 census).

In Croatia, it is a common surname in the middle and south Dalmatia, Međimurje, Požega, Zagorje and Banovina.

It is formed by the patronymic suffix -ić, the possessive infix -ov- and the base Vid (given name).

Its one of the Nobel surnames in Croatia.  Nobel Families of Croatia

The surname may refer to:
 Albin Vidović (born 1943), Croatian handball player
 Ana Vidović (born 1980), Croatian guitar player
 Auggie Vidovich II (born 1981), American racing driver
 Branko Vidović (born 1923), Croatian swimmer
 Emanuel Vidović (1870–1953), Croatian painter and graphic artist
 Gordan Vidović (born 1968), Croatian footballer
 Ivica Vidović (born 1939), Croatian actor
 Jay Vidovich (born 1960), American soccer coach
 Jovan Vidović (born 1989), Slovenian footballer
 Lazar Vidovic (born 1965), Australian footballer
 Marko Vidović (born 1988), Montenegrin footballer
 Matej Vidović (born 1993), Croatian alpine skier
 Miloš Vidović (born 1989), Serbian footballer
 Mirko Vidović (born 1940), Croatian-French writer
 Nikola Vidović (born 1964), Croatian sports instructor
 Rajko Vidović (born 1975), Croatian footballer
 Renzo de' Vidovich (born 1934), Italian politician, historian and journalist
 Saša Vidović (born 1982), Bosnian Serb footballer
 Uroš Vidović (born 1994), Serbian footballer
 Viktor Vidović (born 1973), Croatian classical guitar player
 Izabela Vidovic (born 2001), American Actor

See also
Vidovići (Bosansko Grahovo)

References

Serbian surnames
Croatian surnames
Patronymic surnames

de:Vidović
fr:Vidović
ru:Видович